The Pochera Waterfalls are located in India, at a distance of 37km from Nirmal, 47km from Adilabad and 7km from Boath.

Overview 

The Pochera Waterfalls are classified as plunge waterfalls and fall from a height of twenty meters. The small streams of River Godavari are the source of this waterfall, and these streams gradually breaks away as they flow over the Sahyadri Mountain Range.[1] Pochera waterfall has an emerald, green colored tinge, due to the granite rock bed. Situated amidst dense forests, this waterfall is a popular tourist attraction in Telangana and India.

References

External links 
 https://web.archive.org/web/20140417215255/http://www.mancherialcity.com/temples_tourism/pochera_waterfalls.html Photos
 Route to Pochera waterfalls from Hyderabad

Waterfalls of Telangana